Anjum Singh (1967 – 17 November 2020) was an Indian artist whose works focused on urban ecology, environmental degradation, and her own struggles with cancer. She was born in New Delhi, India, and she continued to live and work there. Singh was the daughter of noted Indian artists Arpita Singh and Paramjit Singh.

Early life 
Singh was born to artists Arpita Singh and Paramjit Singh in New Delhi in 1967. She graduated with a Bachelor of Fine Arts from Kala Bhavana in Shantiniketan, and was influenced by the Hungarian-Indian painter Amrita Sher-Gil. She received her Master of Fine Arts from the College of Art at the Delhi University in 1991. She went on to study painting and print-making at the Corcoran School of the Arts and Design in Washington, D.C., between 1992 and 1994.

Career 
Singh noted the Hungarian-Indian artist Amrita Sher-Gil as amongst her first artistic influences with her early works focusing on figurative motifs. Her works later evolved to showcasing urban ecology and environmental degradation. They were exhibited both in solo shows across India, Singapore, and the US, with her group exhibitions being showcased in Melbourne, Cairo and London, in addition to other cities in India. In a review of her first individual showing in New York in 2002, The New York Times mentioned, "With their lucid forms and appetizing colors, the six paintings in Anjum Singh's New York solo debut make an instantly welcoming first impression, though they tend to keep their meanings in reserve."

Her last exhibition, held in September 2019 at Talwar Gallery in New Delhi and titled I am still here, was autobiographical with her depiction of her own body and her struggles with cancer. The paintings used oil on mixed media. In a review titled "Agony and Ecstasy of Anjum Singh", The Hindu mentioned, "It is one of the most well-hung exhibitions of the season, presenting dramatic views of individual paintings and compelling groupings of works on paper." It is noted that her intimate and sensitive autobiographical depictions stemmed from her own illness and fight against cancer.

Some of her famous works included Bleed Bled Blood Red (2015), Heart (Machine) (2016), and Blackness (2016).

She was a recipient of the Charles Wallace Trust Fellowship for a residency at Gasworks Studios, London, in 2002–03 and had earlier also won an award at the Sahitya Kala Parishad's Yuva Mahotsava in 1991.

Singh died on 17 November 2020 in New Delhi, after a long battle with cancer, aged 53.

Exhibitions
Source:

Solo exhibitions 

1996: Vadehra Art Gallery, New Delhi, India
1999: Gallery Chemould, Mumbai, India
2001: Sakshi Gallery, Bangalore, India
2002: Talwar Gallery Spill, New York, NY, US
2006: Sakshi Gallery, City in Progress, Mumbai, India
Palette Gallery, Spill, New Delhi, India
2007: Bodhi Art, Urban Sprawl, Singapore
2009: Vadehra Art Gallery, All That Glitters is Litter, New Delhi, India
2010: Palette Gallery, The Skin Remembers, New Delhi, India
2015: Talwar Gallery:Masquerade, New York, NY, US
2019: Talwar Gallery, I am still here, New Delhi, India

Group exhibitions
Source:

1994: Asian American Art Center, Betrayal / Empowerment, New York, NY, US
1996: 6th Bharat Bhawan Biennale, Bhopal, India
1997: National Gallery of Modern Art (NGMA), Colors of Independence, New Delhi, India
1997: SAHMAT, Gift of India, New Delhi, India
1998: The Next Wave, Melbourne, Australia
1998: 7th International Cairo Biennale, Cairo, Egypt
1999: Pernegg & Salzburg, The Search Within, Austria, New Delhi & Mumbai, India
1999: Art Ink, Edge of the Century, New Delhi, India
2000: Lakeeren Gallery, Anonymously Yours, Mumbai, India
2000: Sakshi Gallery, Embarkations, Mumbai, India
2000: Jehangir Art Gallery, A Global View: Indian Artists at Home and the World, Mumbai, India
2001: Khoj International Artists Workshop, Modinagar, India
2002: Art Inc., Transfigurations, New Delhi, India
2003: Gallery Chemould, 20×20, Mumbai, India
2005: Bodhi Art, Towards Abstraction, New Delhi, India
2005: Vadehra Art Gallery, Are we like this only?, New Delhi, India
2005: Talwar Gallery, (Desi)re, New York, NY, US
2007: Grosvenor Vadehra Gallery, Here and Now, London, UK
2011: San Jose Museum, Roots in the Air and Branches Below, San Jose, CA, US
2011: Prince of Wales Museum, Fabular Bodies, Mumbai, India

References

External links
Masquerade
I am still here

1967 births
2020 deaths
20th-century Indian painters
20th-century Indian women artists
21st-century Indian women artists
Indian women contemporary artists
Indian contemporary painters
Indian women painters
Women artists from Delhi
Painters from Delhi
Deaths from cancer in India